Northern Ireland competed at the 1962 British Empire and Commonwealth Games in Perth, Western Australia, from 22 November to 1 December 1962.

Medalists

Athletics

Men
Field events

Women
Track events

Field events

See also
 Great Britain at the 1960 Summer Olympics
 Great Britain at the 1964 Summer Olympics

References

Northern Ireland 1962
Nations at the 1962 British Empire and Commonwealth Games
British